Svetlogorsk may refer to:
Svetlogorsk Urban Settlement, several municipal urban settlements in Russia
Svetlogorsk, Russia, several inhabited localities in Russia
Svietlahorsk (Svetlogorsk), a town in Belarus